The 2017 Marvellous 12 was a qualifying event organized by the Chinese Table Tennis Association, Tencent Sports and Shenzhen Municipal Culture, Sports and Tourism Bureau. It was held in Shenzhen, China from 3 to 10 March, 2017. It was the first edition of the tournament. Winners of Phase 1 and Phase 3 of the men's and women's singles event, namely Fan Zhendong, Lin Gaoyuan, Liu Shiwen, and Ding Ning, were each guaranteed a spot to represent China in the 2017 World Table Tennis Championships.

Format and participants
Each event consists of three phases. In Phase 1, twelve players of each event compete in a Round-Robin format and the winners qualify to the World Championships. In Phase 2, an additional player will replace the qualified player. The players would then be divided into 3 groups of 4 players. Each group plays in single-elimination format. In Phase 3, three group winners of Phase 2 compete in a Round-Robin format and the winner qualifies to the World Championships.

Men's singles

 Ma Long
 Zhang Jike
 Fan Zhendong
 Xu Xin
 Xu Chenhao
 Fang Bo
 Liang Jingkun
 Zhou Yu
 Yan An
 Liu Dingshuo
 Lin Gaoyuan
 Zhou Qihao
 Shang Kun (entered Phase 2)
 Zhou Kai (replaced Zhang Jike in Phase 2)

Women's singles

 Ding Ning
 Liu Shiwen
 Zhu Yuling
 Wu Yang
 Wang Manyu
 Gu Yuting
 Chen Meng
 Li Jiayi
 Chen Ke
 Yuan Xuejiao
 Mu Zi
 Feng Yalan
 Che Xiaoxi (entered Phase 2)

Events

Men's singles

Phase 1

Notes:
 Fan Zhendong won this Phase with a head-to-head record of 2-1 against Ma Long.
 Zhang Jike withdrew due to injury after 6 matches and was then replaced by Zhou Kai in Phase 2.

Phase 2

Phase 3

Women's singles

Phase 1

Phase 2

Phase 3

References

External links
Official website

Marvellous 12
2017 in Chinese sport
Table tennis competitions in China
Marvellous 12